The 2010 CSL season was the 13th season in York Region Shooters participation in the Canadian Soccer League. The club ended their CSL campaign by claiming their third division title by finishing first in the First Division. In the postseason York Region faced an early departure after a defeat to Toronto Croatia in the preliminary round. 

As the CSL was granted full membership in the Canadian Soccer Association as a Division III sanctioned professional league the league board of directors merged both the International and National divisions to form the First Division. As a result the Shooters were renamed into the York Region Shooters to reflect the franchises presence in the York Region territory. Throughout the season the club maintain a solid performance finishing the year with the third best offensive record. Kadian Lecky was Vaughan's top goalscorer for the fifth consecutive time with 12 goals. While their reserve team finished fourth in the Reserve Division with a playoff berth.

Summary  
In 2010, the CSL was transferred under the auspices of the Canadian Soccer Association, and was granted full membership. The league's administration restructured the league by combining both divisions to form the CSL First Division. As a result of the changes the club changed its name to York Region Shooters, reflecting the previous merger in 2003 and the larger area of York Region the club has played in and represents. 

Former player Filipe Bento took over the reign of head coach and clinched the club's third regular season championship by finishing first in the standings. Their postseason journey came to an abrupt end after losing 3–1 on goals on aggregate to Toronto Croatia. At the conclusion of the season De Thomasis received the Harry Paul Gauss award, while Rick Titus was awarded the CSL Defender of the Year award.

Club

Management

Squad
As of October 11, 2010.

Transfers

In

Out

Competitions summary

Regular season

First division

Results summary

Results by round

Matches

Postseason

Statistics

Goals 
Correct as of October 8, 2010

References

York Region Shooters
York Region Shooters
2010